Pajieslys (formerly) is a village in Kėdainiai district municipality, in Kaunas County, in central Lithuania. According to the 2011 census, the village had a population of 254 people. There is a wooden Catholic church of St. Mary (built in 1913), a library, and a school. The Pajieslys Geomorphological Sanctuary is located nearby. Pajieslys hosts an ISKCON community.

History
The first church in Pajieslys had been built in 1857. Till the Soviet era there was the Pajieslys manor. Later the settlement was transformed into a kolkhoz and selsovet (1950–1988) center.

Demography

Notable people
Teodora Urszula Piłsudska (1811–1886), grandmother of Józef Piłsudski, buried in the Pajieslys Church cemetery.

Images

References

Villages in Kaunas County
Kėdainiai District Municipality